The Bosnian-Herzegovinian Initiative (abbreviated BHI KF) is a political party in Bosnia and Herzegovina, founded in 2022 by mayor of Zenica Fuad Kasumović.

History
The Bosnian-Herzegovinian Initiative was founded by mayor of Zenica Fuad Kasumović on 19 February 2022.

At the 2022 general election, the party contested all levels of government except for the Presidency. It gained one seat in the national House of Representatives and the Federal House of Representatives.

List of presidents

Elections

Parliamentary elections

Cantonal elections

References

External links
Official Website

Bosniak political parties in Bosnia and Herzegovina
2022 establishments in Bosnia and Herzegovina
Political parties established in 2022
Political parties in Bosnia and Herzegovina
Pro-European political parties in Bosnia and Herzegovina